Caught in Flux is the second album by English band Eyeless in Gaza, recorded in February, 1981, and released in September, 1981 by record label Cherry Red. It was recorded in one take with no overdubs at Woodbine Recording Studios Leamington Spa UK. The Album included a five song EP called "The Eyes of Beautiful Losers".

Track listing
All tracks written by Eyeless in Gaza (Martyn Bates & Peter Becker)

Critical reception 

In a positive review in New Musical Express, Mick Duffy described  Caught In Flux as a progress from Eyeless in Gaza's debut album: "‘Caught In Flux’ is most specifically an introspective LP, a thoughtful compilation of new songs and sound patterns, skilfully patched together and performed, It’s a meditative music for active minds, an exciting vision of a brave new whirl."

Personnel 
 Martyn Bates - Lead Vocals, Fender Telecaster Guitar, Organ
 Peter Becker - Hofner 500/1 Bass, Electronic Dream Plant Wasp Synth, Drums

References

External links 

 

1981 albums
Eyeless in Gaza albums
Cherry Red Records albums